A nymph in ancient Greek folklore is a minor female nature deity. Different from Greek goddesses, nymphs are generally regarded as personifications of nature, are typically tied to a specific place or landform, and are usually depicted as maidens. They were not necessarily immortal, but lived much longer than human beings.

They are often divided into various broad subgroups, such as the Meliae (ash tree nymphs), the Dryads (oak tree nymphs), the Naiads (freshwater nymphs), the Nereids (sea nymphs), and the Oreads (mountain nymphs).

Nymphs are often featured in classic works of art, literature, mythology, and fiction. Since the Middle Ages, nymphs have been sometimes popularly associated or even confused with fairies.

Etymology

The Greek word  has the primary meaning of "young woman; bride, young wife" but is not usually associated with deities in particular. Yet the etymology of the noun  remains uncertain.

Modern usage more often applies to young women, contrasting with parthenos "a virgin (of any age)", and generically as kore ( < ) "maiden, girl". The term is sometimes used by women to address each other and remains the regular Modern Greek term for "bride".

Ancient Greek mythology
Nymphs were sometimes beloved by many and dwelt in specific areas related to the natural environment: e.g. mountainous regions; forests; springs. Other nymphs were part of the retinue of a god (such as Dionysus, Hermes, or Pan) or of a goddess (generally the huntress Artemis).

The Greek nymphs were also spirits invariably bound to places, not unlike the Latin genius loci, and sometimes this produced complicated myths like the cult of Arethusa to Sicily. In some of the works of the Greek-educated Latin poets, the nymphs gradually absorbed into their ranks the indigenous Italian divinities of springs and streams (Juturna, Egeria, Carmentis, Fontus) while the Lymphae (originally Lumpae), Italian water goddesses, owing to the accidental similarity of their names, could be identified with the Greek Nymphae. The classical mythologies of the Roman poets were unlikely to have affected the rites and cults of individual nymphs venerated by country people in the springs and clefts of Latium. Among the Roman literate class, their sphere of influence was restricted and they appear almost exclusively as divinities of the watery element.

Greek folk religion 
The ancient Greek belief in nymphs survived in many parts of the country into the early years of the twentieth century when they were usually known as "nereids". Nymphs often tended to frequent areas distant from humans but could be encountered by lone travelers outside the village, where their music might be heard, and the traveler could spy on their dancing or bathing in a stream or pool, either during the noon heat or in the middle of the night. They might appear in a whirlwind. Such encounters could be dangerous, bringing dumbness, besotted infatuation, madness or stroke to the unfortunate man. When parents believed their child to be nereid-struck, they would pray to Saint Artemidos.

Nymphs and fairies 
Nymphs are often depicted in classic works across art, literature, mythology, and fiction. They are often associated with the medieval romances or Renaissance literature of the elusive fairies or elves.

Sleeping nymph 

A motif that entered European art during the Renaissance was the idea of a statue of a nymph sleeping in a grotto or spring. This motif supposedly came from an Italian report of a Roman sculpture of a nymph at a fountain above the River Danube. The report, and an accompanying poem supposedly on the fountain describing the sleeping nymph, are now generally concluded to be a fifteenth-century forgery, but the motif proved influential among artists and landscape gardeners for several centuries after, with copies seen at neoclassical gardens such as the grotto at Stourhead.

List 
All the names for various classes of nymphs have plural feminine adjectives, most agreeing with the substantive numbers and groups of nymphai. There is no single adopted classification that could be seen as canonical and exhaustive. Some classes of nymphs tend to overlap, which complicates the task of precise classification. e.g. dryads and hamadryads as nymphs of trees generally, meliai as nymphs of ash trees.

By dwelling or affinity 
The following is not the authentic Greek classification, but is intended as a guide:

By location 
The following is a list of individual nymphs or groups thereof associated with this or that particular location. Nymphs in such groups could belong to any of the classes mentioned above (Naiades, Oreades, and so on).

Others 
The following is a selection of names of the nymphs whose class was not specified in the source texts. For lists of Naiads, Oceanids, Dryades etc., see respective articles.

In non-Greek tales influenced by Greek mythology

Sabrina (the river Severn)
Tágides (Tagus River)

Modern use

In modern usage, "nymph" is used in two senses different from the original Greek meaning.
 "Nymph" can be used to describe an attractive, sexually mature young woman. For example, the title of the Perry Mason novel "The Case of the Negligent Nymph" refers to such a young woman who in the book's plot suddenly swims to Mason's canoe. The term can have pejorative connotations regarding the sexual behavior of such women, and derived from it is the term "Nymphomania" referring to female hypersexuality.
 In biology, "nymph" describes an immature form of an insect that does not change greatly as it grows, e.g. a dragonfly, mayfly, or locust.

Gallery

See also

 Animism
 Apsaras
 Houri
 Kami
 Nymphaeum
 Pitsa panels
 Rå
 Xian
 Yakshini
 List of Greek mythological figures

Notes

References
 
 Grimal, Pierre, The Dictionary of Classical Mythology, Wiley-Blackwell, 1996. .
 
 Lawson, John Cuthbert, Modern Greek Folklore and Ancient Greek Religion, Cambridge University Press, Cambridge, 1910, p. 131
 Nereids
 paleothea.com homepage

External links

Nymphs
Elementals